Karen Cook may refer to:
 Karen Cook (sociologist), American sociologist
 Karen Cook (banker), British banker
 Karen Mixon Cook, first professional female nightclub disco disc jockey in the United States

See also
 Karen Koch, pronounced "Cook", American ice hockey goaltender